Ty Howle (born August 20, 1991) is an American football coach who is the tight ends coach for the Penn State Nittany Lions.

References 

Staff."Western names new defensive coordinator", Journal Star, March 22, 2017, retrieved February 7, 2021.
Petrella, Steven."Fathers who coach their kids try to find balance, including dad of Penn State center Ty Howle", Daily Collegian, November 20, 2013, retrieved February 10, 2021.
Bodani, Frank."Penn State football fills out its staff: Former Lion to coach the tight ends", York Daily Record, February 5, 2021, retrieved February 10, 2021.
Staff."Western Illinois' new coach fills out football staff", Journal Star, February 1, 2016, retrieved February 7, 2021.
Juliano, Joe."Penn State hires former lineman Ty Howle as tight ends coach; Big Ten shuffles 2021 football schedule", The Philadelphia Inquirer, February 5, 2021, retrieved February 7, 2021.
UPADHYAYA, Parth."Penn State football announces former Nittany Lion OL Ty Howle as new tight ends coach", Centre Daily Times, February 5, 2021, retrieved February 7, 2021.
Parsons, Ryan."Ty Howle Named Penn State Tight Ends Coach", onwardstate.com, February 5, 2021, retrieved February 7, 2021.

External links 
Penn State player profile
Penn State coaching profile

Further reading

1991 births
Living people
Players of American football from Raleigh, North Carolina
American football offensive linemen
Penn State Nittany Lions football players
Coaches of American football from North Carolina
NC State Wolfpack football coaches
Western Illinois Leathernecks football coaches
Penn State Nittany Lions football coaches